Masjid Al-Dahab (or the Manila Golden Mosque and Cultural Center) is situated in the predominantly Muslim section of the Quiapo district in Manila, Philippines, and is considered the largest mosque in Metro Manila.

Background

The Golden Mosque acquired its name for its gold-painted dome as well as for its location in Globo de Oro Street. Under the supervision of Philippine's then-First Lady Imelda Marcos, construction began on August 4, 1976, for the visit of Libya President Muammar al-Gaddafi, although his visit was cancelled. It was funded through foreign donations, notably from Libya and Saudi Arabia. It now serves many in Manila's Muslim community and is especially full during Jumuah prayers on a Friday. The mosque can accommodate up to 22,000 worshippers.

The mosque incorporates a mixture of foreign and local influences. Its dome and erstwhile minaret are patterned after Middle Eastern structures whereas its geometric designs borrow much from the colors and variations of ethnic Maranao, Maguindanao, and Tausug art. The curved lines are based on the serpent motifs in Maranao art. The mosque used to exhibit stained glass panels by artist Antonio Dumlao. The glass panels are now at the Far Eastern University.

According to the mosque administrators, the minaret was torn down due to problems in structural integrity at the time of then-Mayor Lito Atienza.

Transportation
The mosque is accessible within walking distance south east of Carriedo Station of Manila LRT Line 1. It is also accessible to jeepneys, buses, and UV Express plying the Quezon Boulevard, Rizal Avenue, and Carlos Palanca Sr. Street (Echague) routes.

See also

 Islam in the Philippines

References

External links
 „Golden Mosque“, Globo de Oro str., Quiapo, Manila. Pinoy Travel Blog, 2006.
 Vistapinas: Golden Mosque

Mosques in Metro Manila
Buildings and structures in Quiapo, Manila
Mosques completed in 1976
20th-century religious buildings and structures in the Philippines